Roussillon-en-Morvan ( "Roussillon-in-Morvan") is a rural commune in the Saône-et-Loire department in the Bourgogne-Franche-Comté region in central-east France. In 2019, it had a population of 275. It covers an area of 30.59 km2 (11.81 sq mi).

There has been a church in Roussillon-en-Morvan since the 9th century, as the village is located on the former Gallo-Roman road between Autun and Orléans via Château-Chinon, which runs through the forests of Glenne and Folin. The commune is part of Morvan Regional Natural Park.

See also
Communes of the Saône-et-Loire department
Morvan Regional Natural Park

References

Communes of Saône-et-Loire